Jiawu Township (Mandarin: 加吾乡) is a township in Tongren County, Huangnan Tibetan Autonomous Prefecture, Qinghai, China. In 2010, Jiawu Township had a total population of 4,481: 2,247 males and 2,234 females: 1,108 aged under 14, 2,998 aged between 15 and 65 and 375 aged over 65.

References 

Township-level divisions of Qinghai
Huangnan Tibetan Autonomous Prefecture